The basketball tournaments of NCAA Season 79 are the Philippines' National Collegiate Athletic Association tournaments for basketball in its 2003–2004 season. San Sebastian College – Recoletos hosted the season, starting with an opening ceremony held at the Araneta Coliseum on June 28, 2003, followed by four games. Former Philippine Basketball Association chairman, Shell executive, and San Sebastian alumnus Rey Gamboa graced as the guest of honor. Basketball Association of the Philippines secretary-general Graham Lim served as the season's commissioner. The theme of the season is "NCAA at 79: A Family Through Time." Games then are subsequently held at Rizal Memorial Coliseum and covered by ABS-CBN Sports via Studio 23.

Seniors' tournament

Elimination round

Team standing

Match-up results

Scores
Results on top and to the right of the dashes are for first-round games; those to the bottom and to the left of it are second-round games.

Bracket

Semifinals 
Letran and San Sebastian have the twice-to-beat advantage. They only have to win once, while their opponents, twice, to progress.

Letran vs. Mapua 
Trailing by five points at the half, the Knights took a 7-0 run led by Ronjay Enrile at the start of third quarter. Boyet Bautista then drew a series of fouls and made four straight points from the charity stripe to give the Knights their biggest lead, 56-50. The Cardinals, thanks to Christian Guevarra's three-point play, tried to tie the game at 60-all with four minutes remaining in the game. But the Knights turn to Jonathan Aldave, who scored 10 of his 13 points in the final canto, sealing the win.

San Sebastian vs. JRU 
The Stags used an explosive run in the third quarter to put the Heavy Bombers for good. San Sebastian's Redentor Vicente led the Stags with 19 points, including eight straight in a 10-0 run in the third quarter and gave San Sebastian its biggest lead, 62-53.

Finals 
This is the continuation of the San Sebastian–Letran rivalry.  The last time they met in the Finals was in 1998, where Letran swept San Sebastian, 2-0, en route to the championship. The two-time defending champions Stags are in their fourth-consecutive Finals appearance since 2000. The Stags are mentored by Arturo Valenzona, who authored the Stags' first four of the five straight championships in 1993 to 1997 and added two more from 2001 to 2002. The Knights, on the other hand, won its last championship in 1999 under Binky Favis, are again led by Louie Alas, who gave Letran its 13th title in 1998.

 Finals Most Valuable Player: 

Letran came out in the first game with a barrage from the start of Game 1, even posting a 22-point outing in the third quarter, 59-37. Ronjay Enrile finished with 21 points, helping Letran to lead the series 1-0.

Tied at 71-all in the last three minutes of Game 2, the Stags gunned the Knights down with a 11-2 decisive run, thanks to Christian Baluyot's bail out three-pointer. Redentor Vicente and season MVP Leo Najorda put up the finishing touches to gave San Sebastian the win and extended the series.

Letran led San Sebastian by 11 points, 38-27, before halftime of Game 3, thanks to Aaron Aban's scoring during a 17-3 run. After Boyet Bautista tied the game, 58-all, in the last two minutes of the game, Jonathan Pinera and Aaron Aban made back-to-back clutch hits, as the Stags bungled all their chances to even the game and gave the Knights its 14th championship. Ronjay Enrile scored 19 points and was named Finals MVP.

Awards 
 Most Valuable Player: 
Rookie of the Year:  
 Mythical Five:
 
 
 
 
 
 Most Improved Player: 
 Coach of the Year:

Juniors' tournament

Elimination round

Team standing

Bracket 
{{4TeamBracket-Stepladder
| autolegs = y
| RD1 = Stepladder round 1(Single-elimination)
| RD2 = Stepladder round 2(Single-elimination)
| RD3 = Finals(#1 has twice-to-beat advantage)

|RD1-team1=|RD1-score1=W
|RD1-team2=|RD1-score2=L

|RD2-team1=|RD2-score1=60
|RD2-seed2=3|RD2-team2=|RD2-score2=76|RD3-team1=|RD3-score2-1=70|RD3-score1-1=74|RD3-seed2=3|RD3-team2=
}}

 Finals 
Since San Beda swept the elimination round, they have a twice-to-beat advantage over Mapúa. This is a de facto best of three series with San Beda automatically leading 1-0. Therefore, San Beda has to win once, while Mapúa needed twice, to win the championship.

 Finals Most Valuable Player: 
Red Cubs team captain Ogie Menor, who finished with a double-double, went scoreless in the final period. But teammate James Martinez erupted for a 3-of-5 treys in the fourth quarter, and hit a 14-footer to break a 70-all deadlock with 12 seconds left in the game. Jay-R Taganas got fouled by Juan Tabaquero, then nailed two charities to seal the championship.

 Awards 
 Most Valuable Player: 
 Rookie of the Year: 
 Mythical Five: 
 
 
 
 
 Most Improved Player: 
 Coach of the Year:'''

See also 
 UAAP Season 66 men's basketball tournament

References 

79